Brackwede station is the second most important station in the city of Bielefeld in the German state of North Rhine-Westphalia, after Bielefeld Hauptbahnhof. It was opened in 1847 with the opening of the Cologne-Minden trunk line. It is classified by Deutsche Bahn as a category 4 station. Train services are operated by NordWestBahn and Eurobahn.

Station environment 

Brackwede station has six tracks. The platform for tracks 5 and 6 was completely renovated for Expo 2000 and the reactivation of the Osnabrück–Bielefeld railway to Osnabrück; the height of the platform was raised to 76 cm and given weather protection. The remaining tracks have a platform height of 38 cm.

The platforms are accessible via a pedestrian tunnel that goes from Eisenbahnstraße under the railway tracks and the Ostwestfalendamm expressway to the Naturbad Brackwede (natural bathing pool) on the border of district of Quelle. The tunnel is the main pedestrian and cycling route between central Brackwede and Quelle and since the re-opening of the natural pool in 2009 has provided barrier-free access to both sides. However, the platforms are accessible from the tunnel only via stairs and therefore there is no access for disabled people. The rear part of the tunnel that passes under the Ostwestfalendamm was embellished by young people with a continuous piece of graffiti showing the "skyline" of Brackwede.

The station has a parking area. In addition, covered bike racks and lockable bike boxes are available.

Close-by located next to the Ostwestfalendamm and the natural pool, are a mosque of the Turkish-Azerbaijani Cultural Association, a junkyard, a Turkish/Russian supermarket, Lutter valley including the Lutterkolk (pond) and the sources of the Lutter as well as the Gestamp GMF Umformtechnik (formerly the ThyssenKrupp Umformtechnik) company.

Rail services 

The following Regionalbahn services stop at Brackwede station:

Stadtbahn and bus connections 
Services on Bielefeld Stadtbahn line 1 stop 300 metres to the north east of the station on Gütersloh Straße at a stop called Bahnhof Brackwede, which is reached via a staircase that is not accessible for the disabled. The station is also served by the following bus routes.

It has long been planned for bus lines running on the Brackwerd city ring to pass the station and to end at a terminus in the station district (Bahnhofsviertel), in order to improve connections between trains and buses. Since the relocation of the bus route 94 to Brackweder Kirche, however, only two bus routes operate on this route.

Bielefeld International Bus Station 

On 30 March 2009, the previous three stops for international long-distance bus services in Bielefeld (Hauptbahnhof, Sennestadt Ratio-Markt and Kesselbrink) were brought together at Brackwerd station. This mainly offers connections to Poland and Eastern Europe (including the Baltic states), but also to Western and Southern European countries (France, Portugal, England, Belgium). The domestic long-distance buses to Magdeburg and Berlin (Berlin Linien Bus GmbH) run via the Hauptbahnhof. For the relocation of the bus station to the central part of the Brackwerd station building, it was renovated and equipped with a waiting room for travellers as well as toilets. A travel agency and a newspaper stand are also located in the station building.

Modernisation 

The platform for tracks 5 and 6 and the central part of the station building of Brackwede station is in a very dilapidated condition. The pedestrian tunnel is like a cave, the other platforms have a height of only 38 cm and there were formerly no display boards for the trains, nor barrier-free access to the platforms. In the course of the upgrade for Expo 2000 all stations were modernised along the line to Osnabrück. Only Brackwede station has not been fully rehabilitated. The cost of the remedial work is estimated by DB Station&Service to cost about €4-5 million. DB Station&Service has installed dynamic train service indicators with funding from the recent economic stimulus package.

References

Railway stations in North Rhine-Westphalia
Buildings and structures in Bielefeld
Railway stations in Germany opened in 1847
1847 establishments in Prussia